The Art Conspiracy is a Dallas-based non-profit art collective.

History 
The group was founded by photographer Sarah Jane Semrad and musician Jason Roberts in the fall of 2005 to help raise money for local charities while providing a forum for area artists and musicians to combine forces and promote their works. The group's inaugural gala was held on December 3, 2005, at the Texas Theater (the site of Lee Harvey Oswald's arrest) and raised over $10,000 for the Dallas chapter of the Children's Health Fund. The concept for the event included gathering 100 artists together twenty four hours prior to the event, and having them paint on a single sheet of 18" x 18" plywood. The following day, doors were opened to the long vacant theater and a crowd of close to 1000 people quickly purchased all available pieces through an auction process while local musicians performed.

Personnel 
Sarah Jane Semrad – Art Co-Ordinator
Jason Roberts – Music Co-Ordinator
Andrea Roberts – Sponsorship Procurement
Cari Weinberg – PR
Shea Wood – Stage Design
Courtney Miles – Stage Design
Nyddia Hannah – Concessions
Tim Ruble – Project Manager

External links 
The Art Conspiracy's Official Site – The official homepage.

American artist groups and collectives
Arts in Dallas
Arts organizations based in Texas